"More Than You Know" is a song by Swedish dance music duo Axwell & Ingrosso featuring uncredited vocals from Kristoffer Fogelmark. The song was released in Sweden as a digital download on 27 May 2017 as the tenth single from their debut studio album of the same name. The song was written by Sebastian Ingrosso, Salem Al Fakir, Axel Hedfors, Vincent Pontare and Richard Zastenker. The song peaked at number two on the Swedish Singles Chart.

The music video for the track features model Romi Van Renterghem.

A Latin remix of the song, featuring Colombian singer Sebastián Yatra and Colombian duo Cali y El Dandee, was released worldwide in October 2017.

Music video
The video is shot through a VHS Camcorder, and both depict and reminisce a day in the events of the filmer. The filmer and his girlfriend are shown dressing and attending a concert by Axwell Λ Ingrosso themselves before buying alcohol and attending another party. At the second party, they indulge in food and drink until a fight emerges. The filmer is shown approaching his girlfriend, who is sitting on a pier, supposedly reflecting on the events of the last day before the camcorder's battery runs out, ending the video.

Charts

Weekly charts

Year-end charts

Decade-end charts

Certifications

Release history

See also
List of Airplay 100 number ones of the 2010s

References

2017 songs
2017 singles
Number-one singles in Austria
Number-one singles in Germany
Number-one singles in Poland
Number-one singles in Romania
Songs written by Axwell
Songs written by Sebastian Ingrosso
Songs written by Vincent Pontare
Songs written by Salem Al Fakir
Axwell & Ingrosso songs